Nelson Dock Pier is the official name of a pier on the south bank of the River Thames in Rotherhithe, London, UK. It lies to the south of Columbia Wharf.

Services
The pier is served by the river bus RB4 Canary Wharf - Rotherhithe Ferry, which crosses the Thames to the Canary Wharf business district. Boats operate roughly every 10 minutes, and are operated by Thames Clippers under licence from London River Services, the river transport arm of Transport for London.

Nelson Dock Pier serves the DoubleTree by Hilton London Docklands Riverside Hotel, and the ferry can be used both by guests of the hotel as well as by passengers not staying at the hotel.

Canary Wharf Pier on the other side of the river provides interchange with Thames Clippers RB1 river bus services along the River Thames into central London, as well as an interchange with various other Transport for London services including the London Underground Jubilee line at the nearby Canary Wharf tube station, the Elizabeth line at Canary Wharf railway station and the Docklands Light Railway at Canary Wharf DLR station.

History
The pier was designed by Beckett Rankine and constructed by Downtown Marine Construction, the architect was Price and Cullen. The pier is named after the Nelson Dock, a 17th-century dry dock which was used for shipbuilding until 1968. The dock is not thought to have been named after Horatio Nelson, in spite of his historical connections to the area.

External links
A 360° panorama of Rotherhithe Street in front of Nelson House

References

London River Services
Transport in the London Borough of Southwark
Piers in London
Rotherhithe